The Miss Paraguay 2007 pageant was won by  María José Maldonado. In took place on 17 March 2007 at the Municipal Theatre Ignacio A. Pane in Asunción, Paraguay. 18 delegates competed for the title, previously held by Lourdes Arévalos. The pageant was broadcast live on Telefuturo.

Results

Delegates

Judges
The following persons judged the final competition.
Evanhy de Gallegos
Liz Crámer
Miguel Martin
Yanina González (Miss Universo Paraguay 2004)
Marithé Rasmussen
Sannie López Garelli
Tacho Rojas

See also
Miss Paraguay

External links

Video of the Crowning moment

2007
2007 beauty pageants
2007 in Paraguay
March 2007 events in South America